Sven Lehmann (born 18 December 1991) is a Swiss footballer who plays as a forward for Eschen/Mauren.

External links

1991 births
Living people
Swiss men's footballers
Association football forwards
FC St. Gallen players
Swiss Super League players
Sportspeople from St. Gallen (city)